Samuel Robinson (19 October 1666 – 9 December 1729) of Cheshunt, Hertfordshire was an English Member of Parliament.

He was the oldest surviving son of William Robinson of Bishop's Lane, Cheshunt and studied law at Gray's Inn from 1686.

He was the Member of Parliament for Cricklade in the parliaments of 1710–1713 and 1 June 1714–1715.

References 

1666 births
1729 deaths
People from Cheshunt
17th-century English people
18th-century English people
Members of Gray's Inn
Members of the Parliament of Great Britain for English constituencies
Members of Parliament for Cricklade
British MPs 1710–1713
British MPs 1713–1715
Cheshunt